Srijato Bandopadhyay is an Indian poet of the Bengali language. He won the Ananda Puroskar in 2004 for his book Udanta Sawb Joker: All Those Flying Jokers. In 2014, he won the Filmfare Awards East for Best Lyricist for the song 'Balir Shohor' from 'Mishawr Rawhoshyo'.

Srijato’s poetic composition 'Megh Bodoler Kabbi' has been published in International Kolkata Bookfair 2020 along with another novel Briksha Onubadak. Besides writing poems and songs, he also does anchoring and Public Speaking. Recently he made his acting debut in Srijit Mukherji's film Zulfiqar. He has also attended a writer's workshop at the University of Iowa.

Early life
Srijato was born in a musical family. He lived at Garia and spent his childhood at Kamdohari, Narkelbagan. Srijato is the grandchild of classical vocalist Sangeetacharya Tarapada Chakraborty and nephew of musician and the Khalifa of Kotali Gharana Pandit Manas Chakraborty; his mother is also a classical vocalist Gaan Saraswati Srila Bandopadhyay. His early schooling was completed to Jadavpur Vidyapith and he graduated from the Asutosh College, a University of Calcutta affiliate.

Subsequent career 
Srijato started his writing career in the 1990s. He currently lives in Selimpur, southern Kolkata with his wife Durba. Having worked as a journalist, he is now on the editorial board of the magazine "Prathama".

Works
His notable works include Chotoder Chiriyakhana: The menagerie for kids (2005),  Katiushar golpo: Tales untold  (2006), Borshamongol : The monsoon epic  (2006), Okalboisakhi: Storms unprecedent (2007), Likhte hole bhodrobhabe lekho: Write politely, if you have to (2002), Ses Chithi: Last Letter (1999), Bombay to Goa (2007), Coffer namti Irish : Irish Coffee  (2008), Onubhob korechi tai bolchi : Revealing the feeling (1998).His book of poems, Andhakar Lekhaguchchha was firstly posted in the Facebook by the poet. Every poem of this book is a Sonnet.

He has also written novels. His first novel is "4043".His second novel was published in Pujabarshiki Anondolok, named "Shalimare Shonghat".

Poem
 Sesh Chithi (1999)
 Du-char Katha (2000)
 Anubhab Korchi Tai Bolchi (2001)
 Likhte hole Bhodrobhabe Lekho (2002)
 Uronto Sob Joker (2004)
 Chotoder Chiriyakhana (2005)
 Katiushar Golpo (2006)
 Borshamongol (2006)
 Okalboisakhi (2007)
 Bombay To Goa (2007)
 coffee'r Namti Irish (2008)
 Betu Ar Jethu (2008)
 Emni Boi (2009)
 Sesh Chithi Du-char Katha (2009)
 Combinasia (2010)
 Kichu Kobita (2011)
 Chhai Ronger Gram (2011)
 Train Haranor Gondho (2012)
 Amar Santa Thakur (2012) (Prose)
 Ami Ar William (2013)
 Karkatkrantir Desh (2014)
 Bandhobi Gach (2015)
 Kobita Somogro-I (2015)
 Andhakar Lekhaguchchha (2015)
 Kobita Somogro II (2016)
 Shalimare Songhat (2017) (Novel) 
 Premer Kobita (2017)
 Mushtaq Hussain er Dorbari (2017)
 Taravora Akasher Niche (2018) (Novel)
 Dhongso (2018)
 Lymeric (2018)
 Srijator Facebook (2018) (a collection of Facebook posts)
 Je Jotsna Harinatito (2019)
 Je Kotha Boloni Aage (2019) (Novel)
 Ja Kichu Aaj Byaktigoto (2019) (Prose)
 Megh Bodoler Kabbi (2020)
 Briksha Onubadok (2020) (Novel)
  Srijator Facebook ii (2020) (a collection of facebook posts)
  Sababahika (2021)
  Kuyashanagarir Upaksyan (2021)(Novel)

Lyrics

Awards
 2004 : Ananda Puraskar -  উড়ন্ত সব জোকার (Poetry)
 2014 : Filmfare Awards East for Best Lyricist - "Balir Shohor" from Mishawr Rawhoshyo
 2014 : Bangla Academy Award- কর্কটক্রান্তির দেশ (Poetry)

See also
 Haath Dhoreche Gaacher Paata

References

External links
 
 Poems by Srijato
 Lyrics by Srijato
 Poetry International page

Bengali male poets
Recipients of the Ananda Purashkar
Living people
Asutosh College alumni
University of Calcutta alumni
Year of birth missing (living people)
Writers from Kolkata